Battlement Mountain may refer to:

Battlement Mountain (Montana), a mountain in the Lewis Range, Glacier National Park, Montana, USA
Battlement Mountain (Wyoming), a mountain in the Absaroka Range, Wyoming, USA

See also
Battle Mountain (disambiguation)